= Avenue France =

South Korean chain of shopping malls

Coordinates: 37°17′26.3″N 127°03′02.5″E

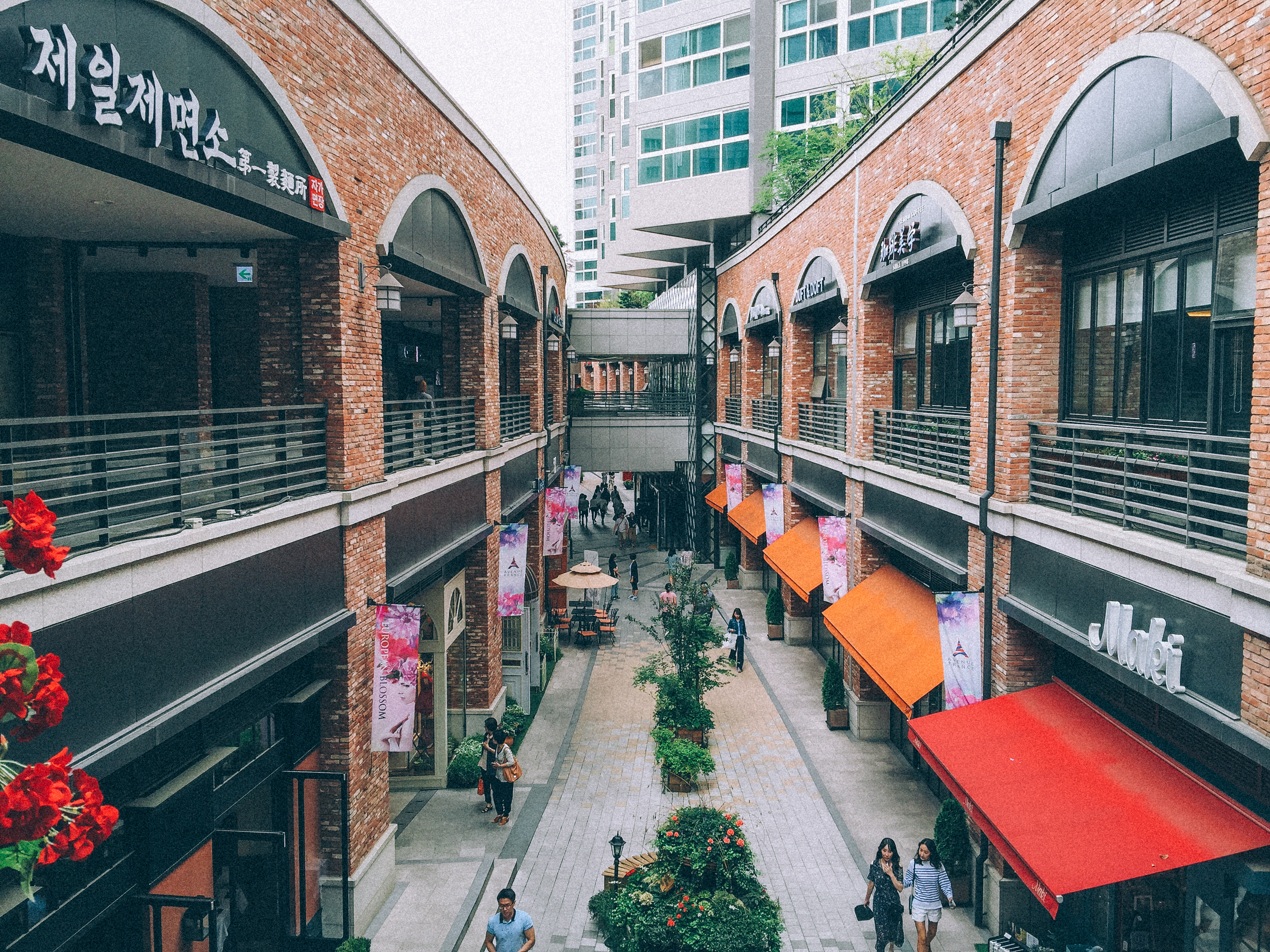
Avenue France, Seongnam, June 18, 2015

Avenue France is a shopping mall in Suwon and Seongnam, South Korea.
